German Opačić (August 8, 1857 – January 18, 1899) was the Serbian Orthodox prelate and the last Bishop of Bačka in the 19th century.

Early life and education 
Opačić was born as Milan Opačić on 8 August 1857 in the village of Slabinja, in the Banija region in Austrian Empire (present-day Croatia). His father Marko was a Serbian Orthodox priest and mother Sofia was a priest-wife. After finishing elementary school in Vojnić, Opačić graduated from a gymnasium in Zagreb and Novi Sad. For a while he studied law in Zagreb, but he graduated from Clerical High School of Saint Arsenije in 1884. From 1884 to 1890 Opačić was catechist in gymnasium, and since 1889 was a professor of seminary.

Spiritual service 
Opačić became consistory-notary of Archeparchy of Karlovci in 1890. He entered the Kuveždin monastery on the Fruška Gora mountain where he was spiritually guided by hegumen Amfilohije (Jeremić) and became a monk.

Opačić was ordained by Archbishop of Karlovci and Serbian Patriarch German as deacon-monk on April 24, 1888. On December 13, 1890 he was ordained as protodeacon and on October 6, 1891 as archdeacon by Patriarch Georgije.

Opačić was ordained on Christmas Day in 1891 as presbyter and as syncellus on same occasion. In 1892 he was ordained as protosyncellus.

Opačić was unanimously elected as the Bishop of Bačka in 1893 and consecrated on Saint George's Day in 1894 by Patriarch Georgije, Bishop of Timișoara Nikanor Popović and Bishop of Gornji Karlovac Mihailo Grujić.

Death 
After a short illness, Opačić died in Vienna in January 1899. He was buried in Plato's chapel at the Almaš Cemetery in Novi Sad, Austria-Hungary (present-day Serbia).

See also 
Eparchy of Bačka

References

1857 births
1899 deaths
19th-century Eastern Orthodox bishops
19th-century Serbian people
Bishops of Bačka
People from Slabinja, Croatia
Serbs of Croatia